Boothrips is a genus of thrips in the family Phlaeothripidae.

Species
 Boothrips singularis

References

Phlaeothripidae
Thrips
Thrips genera